Judaa Hoke Bhi is a 2022 Indian supernatural-horror film written by Mahesh Bhatt and directed by Vikram Bhatt and produced by Loneranger Productions and Houseful Motion Pictures. India's first film completely shot in the Virtual Production Studio with the help of Unreal Engine technology, is bankrolled by Mahesh Bhatt and K Sera Sera Vikram Bhatt Productions. The film features Akshay Oberoi and Aindrita Ray in lead roles and Meherzan Mazda in supporting role. It was released on 15 July 2022.

Cast
 Akshay Oberoi as Aman Khanna
 Aindrita Ray as Meera
 Meherzan Mazda as Siddharth Jaiwardhan
 Jia Mustafa 
 Rushad Rana
 Punit Tejwani

Plot
Aman and Meera are a married couple. Aman does not like it when Meera talks to him about practical things like bills, EMIs and earning money to run the home. He would rather drink himself silly and sing at random bars than in a studio that actually wants to pay him.We soon find out that the supposed reason behind Aman's drinking is that the couple lost their only son some years ago. Meera is a successful writer who has been offered a suspiciously lucrative 'ghost' writing assignment at a secluded spot in Uttrakhand. Just when Meera is about to leave, Aman meets with an accident and slip into a coma.Meera decides to skip the assignment and huddle at Aman's sick bed. To change her mind, the Villain assignment-offerer sends a very efficient creature/ ghost/ monster/ dubuk to the hospital where Aman is. The creature then impersonates a nurse, who is on leave, and gets the ward boy to substitute Aman's medicine with alcohol - this very roundabout plan actually succeeds because Meera smells the alcohol, gets angry with Aman and reverts to her decision of going to Uttrakhand.
Once she reaches there, Meera is immediately warned by a very random yet very convincing Yamdoot-like middle aged blind man to run for her life but for some reason she does not heed this warning. The Yamdoot-man then tries to scare-convince Aman to save Meera. Aman relents and leaves for Binsar. At Binsar, Meera's new boss is big time into pet monsters and herbs that make girls horny for him. when aman arrives to take meera out of the palace, the girl named rohi who is the daughter of that blind person, helped them to run from that place. but at the station, meera suffers from a severe stomach pain which is caused by her boss as he has some powers. Aman admits meera in a hospital there she  admits that she slept with her boss and suddenly changes her voice into the horror one then goes to her boss and live with him. Aman returns to that blind persons house and seeks his help where the person tells him that, that person is his great great grandfather and recites the whole story to him. Later it is reveled that the monster meera's boss was having was no one but ruhi. 

At last aman saves her wife and takes him back. It is reveled then that this was just a dream of Aman and he is still in hospital after his accident. In the end both do the funeral of their son and the film ends.

Production
In March 2022, K Sera Sera and Vikram Bhatt's Studio Virtual Worlds announced the setting up of their LED virtual production studio. In May end they announced production of first film titled Judaa Hoke Bhi directed by Vikram Bhatt and completely shot in the Virtual Production Studio with the help of Epic Games' Unreal Engine.

Soundtrack

Music of the film is composed by Puneet Dixit, Amjad Nadeem Aamir, Chote Baba and Harish Sagane and lyrics are penned by Shweta Bothra and Puneet Dixit. The songs are released by Zee Music Company. The album was released on 1 July 2022.

Track list

Reception 
Archika Khurana of The Times of India rated the film 2.5 out of 5 stars and praised the songs writing, "The songs are soulful and heighten the impact of the drama". Concluding her review Khurana wrote, "All said, this overstretched drama is way too cliched and soppy to hold your attention, but it does amuse you in its own unique ways. The performances and the soulful music definitely make this 122-minute drama worth a one-time watch."

References

External links
 

2022 films
2020s Hindi-language films
Indian romantic horror films
Indian supernatural horror films